Liên Tâm Monastery (previously Lotus Heart Temple) is a Buddhist monastery located in Moisio, Turku. It is the first Buddhist monastery inaugurated in Finland. The monastery is administered by the Vietnamese Buddhist Association of Finland. The association is one of the biggest Buddhist associations in Finland and follows Mahayana. Moreover, Pure Land Buddhism and Zen are practiced in the monastery.

In 2010 during its construction the monastery fell victim to an attempted arson.

See also 

 Monastery's web site

Sources 

Buddhist monasteries
Buildings and structures in Turku
Tourist attractions in Turku
Buddhism in Finland